Bill Speakman (16 November 1904 – 2 May 1960) was an Australian rules footballer who played with Essendon in the Victorian Football League (VFL).

Notes

External links 
		

1904 births
1960 deaths
Australian rules footballers from Victoria (Australia)
Essendon Football Club players
Coburg Football Club players